Roxsolt Liv SRAM is an Australian women's road bicycle racing team which participates in elite women's races. The team was established in 2013.

Team roster

Major results
2021
Zombie Park #1 Adelaide Cyclo-cross, Isabella Flint
Zombie Park #2 Adelaide Cyclo-cross, Isabella Flint

National Champions
2016
 New Zealand U23 Time Trial, Georgia Catterick

2019
 Australia Road Race, Sarah Gigante

References

External links

UCI Women's Teams
Cycling teams based in Australia
Cycling teams established in 2013